The 2015 Surrey Storm season saw them finish as Netball Superleague champions for the first time. Between 2011 and 2014, Surrey Storm played in three out of the four grand finals. After finishing as runners up in all three, Surrey Storm won their first Netball Superleague title in 2015. During the regular season they finish second behind Manchester Thunder. They subsequently defeated Yorkshire Jets at the semi-final stage before defeating Hertfordshire Mavericks in the grand final.

Squad

Pre-season
Friendly 

ReEnergise Tri-Tournament

Regular season

Results
Round 1

Round 2

Round 3

Round 4

Round 5

Round 6

Round 7

Round 8

Round 9

Round 10

Round 11

Round 12

Round 13

Round 14

Final table

Play-offs

Semi-finals

Grand Final

References

Surrey
Surrey Storm seasons